This is a list of populated places in Peru. It was initially derived from the Geonames database of all populated places with a population of at least 1,000 in Peru.

References

 
Peru
Populated Places